Bekofafa Sud (or in Malagasy: Bekofafa Atsimo) is a rural municipality in Atsimo-Atsinanana Region in south-eastern Madagascar.

The unpaved  National road T 18 passes by this municipality.

References

Populated places in Atsimo-Atsinanana